Russell Collier "Rusty" Saunders (March 12, 1906 – November 24, 1967), was an American Major League Baseball outfielder who played in  with the Philadelphia Athletics. He was born and died in Trenton, New Jersey.  He batted and threw right-handed. Saunders began his professional baseball career with the Chambersburg Maroons of the Blue Ridge League in 1927.  He had a very impressive .983 fielding percentage playing in 95 games as part of the Chambersburg team that won the Blue Ridge Championship that year.  After the Blue Ridge League season ended, Saunders was called up to the baseball major leagues. Saunders had a .133 batting average in five games, two hits in 15 at-bats, in his brief time in the majors. He continued to play minor league baseball through the 1931 season.

Saunders, at 6'2" (1.88 m) and 205 lb (93 kg), also played professional basketball. He played in a number of professional leagues, including the American Basketball League and National Basketball League, among others.

References

External links

1906 births
1967 deaths
American Basketball League (1925–1955) players
American men's basketball players
Baseball players from Trenton, New Jersey
Basketball players from Trenton, New Jersey
Chambersburg Maroons players
Detroit Eagles players
Fort Wayne Hoosiers (basketball) players
Indianapolis Kautskys players
Major League Baseball outfielders
Philadelphia Athletics players
Small forwards